"Christmas Time Is Here" is a popular Christmas standard written by Vince Guaraldi and Lee Mendelson for the 1965 television special A Charlie Brown Christmas, one of the first animated Christmas specials produced for network television in the United States.

Two versions were included on the album A Charlie Brown Christmas: an instrumental version by the Vince Guaraldi Trio and a vocal version by choristers from St. Paul's Episcopal Church in San Rafael, California, who had previously performed with Guaraldi on At Grace Cathedral (1965).

Background
"Christmas Time Is Here" was composed by jazz pianist Vince Guaraldi to accompany the opening of the 1965 television special A Charlie Brown Christmas. It was originally written as an instrumental, but producer Lee Mendelson decided that the song needed lyrics. Mendelson recalled, "When we looked at the show about a month before it was to go on the air, I said, 'That's such a pretty melody; maybe we should try and find some people to put some lyrics to it. When he was unable to find someone available, he wrote the lyrics himself:

The vocals for the song were provided by the children's choir at St. Paul's Episcopal Church in San Rafael. Guaraldi had previously performed with the ensemble at his May 1965 "jazz mass" performance at Grace Cathedral.

The song has since become a perennial Christmas classic. Drummer Jerry Granelli of the Vince Guaraldi Trio commented, "It's amazing: Vince finally wrote a standard. 'Christmas Time Is Here' has been recorded as a standard, and Vince always wanted to write a standard. So he made it."

Musical composition 
The song is a waltz composed in F major with an AABA form. During the "B section", the song tonicizes into the key of D-flat major.

Reception and legacy
"Christmas Time Is Here" remains a popular Christmas song long after its release; as Matt Thompson of The Atlantic writes, "If it wasn’t already a standard that first time it was played, it is now the very definition." Erik Adams of The A.V. Club pointed to the song's juxtaposition of nostalgic lyrics and minor-key composition as a reason for its longevity: "As 'Christmastime Is Here' and the other songs from A Charlie Brown Christmas have been folded into the catalogue of enduring Christmas carols, they’ve continued to stand out by representing a particular strain of wintry melancholy."

The song has also charted on the Holiday 100, reaching number 17 in 2017—over 50 years after its original release.

Charts

Cover versions
The first person to record a cover version of the song was jazz guitarist Ron Escheté on the album Christmas Impressions (1982). David Benoit followed him on the album Christmastime (1983). They were followed by Patti Austin and Debby Boone (both in 1989); Mel Tormé (1992), then Rosemary Clooney, R.E.M., and Stone Temple Pilots before the turn of the century.

See also
List of cover versions of Vince Guaraldi songs
List of jazz standards
Christmas music

References

1960s jazz standards
1965 singles
1965 songs
Compositions by Vince Guaraldi
American Christmas songs
Ivy (band) songs
Peanuts music
Jazz standards
Jazz compositions
Jazz compositions in F major
Fantasy Records singles